Bolboli or Bal Bali may refer to:
 Bal Bali, Fars
 Bolboli, Hormozgan